The following lists events that happened during 2007 in Zimbabwe.

Incumbents
 President: Robert Mugabe 
 Prime Minister: Morgan Tsvangirai 
 First Vice President: Joice Mujuru
 Second Vice President: Joseph Msika

Events

February
 February 21 - Police in Zimbabwe ban rallies in parts of Harare that are seen as strongholds of the opposition party Movement for Democratic Change.

March
 March 11 - Leading opponents of Zimbabwe's President Robert Mugabe, including Morgan Tsvangirai, leader of the Movement for Democratic Change, and four other members of parliament and party activists, are arrested for defying a ban on protest rallies in Harare. Riot police shoot one activist dead.
 March 12 - The High Court of Zimbabwe rules that detained opposition leader Morgan Tsvangirai of the Movement for Democratic Change must either be brought into court on Tuesday or released.
 March 13 - Tsvangirai appears in court limping and with a head wound after having been arrested on Sunday. Tsvangarai is later taken from court to a hospital under police guard.
 March 17 - Three activists in the Zimbabwe opposition are arrested as they attempt to leave the country for South Africa including Arthur Mutambara, leader of a faction in the Movement for Democratic Change. Two of the activists were seeking medical treatment after having been arrested a week ago.
 March 22 - The Roman Catholic Archbishop of Bulawayo Pius Ncube calls for mass protests to force President Robert Mugabe from power.
 March 28 - The Movement for Democratic Change says its leader, Morgan Tsvangirai, has been arrested by police. He was later released but other activists remained in police custody.

April
 April 22 - Investigating officer Wellington Ngena accuses the government of South Africa's Scorpions intelligence department of training members of the Movement for Democratic Change in combat to overthrow the government of Zimbabwe.

June
 June 13 - Zimbabwean Minister of Lands Didymus Mutasa says the government will remove all remaining white farmers from their farms and divide their land among landless black citizens.
 June 22 - Inflation in Zimbabwe rises to 11,000%; U.S. ambassador Christopher Dell predicts it will reach 1.5 million percent by December.

July
 July 5 - The Zimbabwe Congress of Trade Unions votes to strike for higher wages as inflation in Zimbabwe rises above 10,000%.
 July 31 - The International Monetary Fund estimates that inflation in Zimbabwe could reach 100,000% by the end of 2007.

September
 September 7 - Robert Mugabe, the President of Zimbabwe, accused Levy Mwanawasa, the President of Zambia and Chairman of the Southern African Development Community, of selling out his country to the Western world and plotting with foreign intelligence agencies during an SADC conference in August. President Mwanawasa later apologized to Mugabe, saying Mugabe had misunderstood an earlier comment.
 September 26 - The House of Assembly of Zimbabwe passes legislation transferring control of all foreign-owned businesses to Zimbabweans.

November
 November 18 - George Charamba, the spokesman for Robert Mugabe, the President of Zimbabwe, says the Mugabe government is preparing for a British invasion.
 November 21 - Portuguese Minister of Foreign Affairs Luís Amado says Zimbabwean President Robert Mugabe is not welcome at the December European Union-African Union summit in Lisbon. United Kingdom Prime Minister Gordon Brown says he will not attend if Mugabe is present.
 November 27 - Zambian Airways ends direct flights to Harare. British Airways ended flights last month and Ethiopian Airlines will end flights to Zimbabwe in December, leaving only three foreign airlines with planes flying to Zimbabwe in 2008.

December
 December 15 - Sikhanyiso Ndlovu, the Information Minister of Zimbabwe, calls Chancellor Angela Merkel of Germany a "Nazi". Ndlovu responded to the German government's criticism of rising human rights abuses in Zimbabwe by telling Merkel to "shut up".

References

 
2000s in Zimbabwe
Years of the 21st century in Zimbabwe
Zimbabwe
Zimbabwe